Mucharzew  (till December 31, 2001 as at Mucharzów) is a village in the administrative district of Gmina Osiek, within Staszów County, Świętokrzyskie Voivodeship, in south-central Poland.

The village has a population of  261.

Demography 
According to the 2002 Poland census, there were 270 people residing in Mucharzew village, of whom 50.7% were male and 49.3% were female. In the village, the population was spread out, with 30.4% under the age of 18, 35.1% from 18 to 44, 17.8% from 45 to 64, and 16.7% who were 65 years of age or older.
 Figure 1. Population pyramid of village in 2002 — by age group and sex

Former parts of village — physiographic objects 
In the years 1970 of last age, sorted and prepared out list part of names of localities for Mucharzów — at as name of localities now is Mucharzew, what you can see in table 3.

References

Mucharzew